Masanari (written: 正也, 正就, 正成, 雅也 or 雅誠) is a masculine Japanese given name. Notable people with the name include:

, Japanese samurai
, Japanese samurai
, Japanese slalom canoeist
, Japanese actor
, Japanese footballer
, Japanese long-distance runner

Japanese masculine given names